The festival of San Lorenzo is a religious holiday occurring every year in Tarapacá, Chile. In 2011, it is estimated that 70,000 people attended. The festival celebrates Saint Lawrence, a deacon from Spain, who was martyrized during the Roman's persecution of the Catholic Church during the rule of Valerian. Lawrence died in a fire on August 10, 258 in Rome.

The celebration begins on August 6th each year, when hundreds of religious dancers arrive in the city, from nearby places such as Iquique, Calama, Arica, Alto Hospicio, and Tocopilla. Recently, attendees from Antofagasta began attending and sleeping in tents throughout the city during the festival. One of the largest attractions of the festival is the extravagant dances which are performed by different Catholic dance troupes during the festival. These dances are performed to please or worship Saint Lawrence or to demonstrate their faith.

In 2005, the festival did not occur as normal. This is due to severe damages from the earthquake which occurred earlier that year. Despite these damages, the temple of San Lorenzo was rebuilt. Furthermore, in 2013, a large number of cases of influenza led to infection control methods being implemented at the festival. The festival was cancelled by Guillermo Vera, bishop of the diocese of Iquique, in 2020 due to the COVID-19 pandemic in Chile.

References 

San Lorenzo